Shērōē is a Middle Persian name, meaning 'The Lion', whose new Persian form is Shīrūya/Shiruyeh, . Its uses include:
 Shērōē (590 – 628), better known by the dynastic name of Kavadh II, a king of the Sasanian Empire in 628
 Siroe, re di Persia, an opera seria by Handel based on fictionalised events in the life of Kavadh II
 Shiruya al-Uswari, a nobleman of the Sasanian Empire
 Asfar ibn Shiruya (died 931), ruler of Tabiristan and northern Jibal between 928 and 930.
 Shiruyeh is a village in North Khorasan Province, Iran.